The Chinese Boycott of 1905 was a large-scale boycott of American goods in Qing dynasty that began on 10 May 1905. The catalyst was the Gresham-Yang Treaty of 1894, which was an extension of the 1882 Chinese Exclusion Act. An indirect cause was the years of violence against Chinese immigrants, most recently in San Francisco plague of 1900–1904.

The boycott lasted for almost one year and garnered support from all major Chinese organizations. It came to an end when the Qing government revoked its support for the boycott. Ultimately the boycott did not change any discriminatory laws in the US; however, the Chinatown raids eventually ceased. The boycott extended across to the Chinese diaspora in the Philippines, Singapore, Malaysia, Japan and Hawaii.

Causes

US legislative history on excluding Chinese

The Chinese were brought to the U.S. under a contract system to help with the construction of the pacific coast railroad. A treaty negotiated by the Secretary William H. Seward called The Burlingame Treaty of 1868 allowed unlimited freedom for the Chinese to immigrate to the United States. The treaty also prohibited the U.S. from meddling into China's internal affairs as well as granted American citizens privilege in China. By 1880 The U.S. modified the treaty to restrict the immigration of Chinese workers with the approval of China. Two years later in 1882 congress passed the Chinese Exclusion Act that required Chinese immigrants residing in the United States to carry identification papers with them at all times. Extensions of the act include the 1888 Scott Act, 1892 Geary Act and, 1894 Gresham-Yang Treaty.

1894 Treaty
The 1894 Gresham-Yang Treaty automatically extended for 10 years after its expiration on December 7, 1904 unless further negotiation was made. It was the further negotiation in May 1905 at Beijing that sparked the boycott. Just before the boycott, US sent her new ambassador, William Woodville Rockhill, to Beijing.

Violence against Chinese immigrants
Among other violent episodes against Chinese immigrants is the Boston Chinatown immigration raid of October, 11 1903. During the San Francisco plague of 1900–1904 other episodes of racial discrimination against Chineses immigrants had taken place.

1905 Boston incident 
In 1905, four Chinese students were detained in Boston by immigration officials. This gave momentum to the boycott movement.

The boycott

The boycott originated when the Chinese Consolidated Benevolent Association of San Francisco called upon the people of China to pressure the United States into treating the Chinese immigrants in America better. Afterwards, telegrams were sent out by Tseng Shao-Ching, leader of the Shanghai Chamber of Commerce to merchants to boycott American products; if the merchant refuse, the boycott committee would ensure that they follow their instructions.

Timeline 
Chinese immigrants were brought to the U.S. under a contract system to help with the construction of the Pacific Coast railroad. The Burlingame Treaty of 1868 was negotiated by Secretary William H. Seward allowed unlimited freedom for the Chinese to immigrate to the United States. A majority of Chinese migrated out of China to go to the United States suffered a huge amount of discrimination and prejudice compared to Chinese who have gone to other countries.

Several events lead up to the boycott of 1905. These events were regarded as attempts to expel the Chinese from America during the late nineteenth and early twentieth centuries.

Organizations involved 
The boycott drew support from many major Chinese organizations, including
 Chinese Consolidated Benevolent Association
 Chinese Americans under protection of Zhuyue Zongju

References

Further reading
 
 Larson, Jane Leung. "Articulating China's First Mass Movement: Kang Youwei, Liang Qichao, the Baohuanghui, and the 1905 Anti-American Boycott." Twentieth-Century China 33.1 (2007): 4-26.
 Larson, Jane Leung. "The 1905 anti-American boycott as a transnational Chinese movement." Chinese America: History and Perspectives (2007): 191+
 McKee, Delber L. “The Chinese Boycott of 1905-1906 Reconsidered: The Role of Chinese Americans.” Pacific Historical Review 55#2 (1986), pp. 165–191. online
 Meissner, Daniel J. "China's 1905 Anti-American Boycott: A Nationalist Myth?." Journal of American-East Asian Relations 10.3-4 (2001): 175-196.
 Ts'ai, Shih‐shan H. "Reaction to Exclusion: The Boycott of 1905 and Chinese National Awakening." The Historian 39.1 (1976): 95-110.
 Wang, Guanhua. In Search of Justice: The 1905-1906 Chinese Anti-American Boycott (Harvard Univ Asia Center, 2001).
 Wong, Sin-Kiong. "Die for the boycott and nation: Martyrdom and the 1905 anti-American movement in China." Modern Asian Studies 35.3 (2001): 565-588. online

China–United States economic relations
Anti-Americanism
1905 in China
Boycotts of countries